Hyposmocoma coprosmae is a species of moth of the family Cosmopterigidae. It was first described by Otto Swezey in 1920. It is endemic to the Hawaiian island of Oahu. The type locality is Malamalama, Mount Konahuanui.

The larvae feed on Coprosma longijolia.

External links

coprosmae
Endemic moths of Hawaii
Moths described in 1920